Owen Tudor was a Welsh courtier, grandfather of Henry VII.

Owen Tudor may also refer to:

Owen Frederick Morton Tudor (1900–1987), officer in 3rd The King's Own Hussars and the husband of Larissa Tudor
Owen Tudor (horse)

See also
Tudor Owen (disambiguation)